Akira Toriumi is an engineer at the University of Tokyo, Japan. He was named a Fellow of the Institute of Electrical and Electronics Engineers (IEEE) in 2016 for his contributions to device physics and materials engineering for advanced CMOS technology.

References 

Fellow Members of the IEEE
Living people
Year of birth missing (living people)